Collage is the third Korean studio album by k-pop boy band UKISS. The title track is "Standing Still"

Release
On February 28, 2013 photo teasers were released of all of the members. The photo teasers had a "dreamlike look with translucent and hazy colors." The album was released at 12PM (KST) on March 7, 2013. Due to unknown difficulties the music video was released a day later after the full album on March 8, 2013.

Solos and duets on the album
On March 3, 2013 it was announced that there would be 3 solos and duets on the album. Kevin performed a solo called "My Reason", Eli and AJ made a duet called "Party All the Time", and Soohyun and Hoon also performed a duet which they promoted called "More Painful Than Pain".

Track listing 
The album's tracks are as follows:

Chartings

Sales

References

U-KISS albums
2013 albums
Korean-language albums